The White House press corps is the group of journalists, correspondents, and members of the media usually assigned to the White House in Washington, D.C., to cover the president of the United States, White House events, and news briefings. Its offices are located in the West Wing.

Overview

The White House press secretary, or a deputy, generally holds a weekday news briefing in the James S. Brady Press Briefing Room, which currently seats 49 reporters. Each seat is assigned to a news gathering organization, with the most prominent organizations occupying the first two rows. Reporters who do not have an assigned seat may stand. Often a smaller group of reporters known as the "press pool" is assembled to report back to their colleagues on events where the venue would make open coverage logistically difficult. There can be different pools assembled on any given day to include a pool covering the president, vice president, first lady, and other prominent members of the staff.

When a new U.S. president is elected, some news organizations change their correspondents, most often to the reporter who had been assigned to cover the new president during the preceding campaign. For example, after the 2020 United States presidential election, Peter Doocy, Fox News' lead campaign reporter during the two years that Joe Biden campaigned for president, moved on to be the chief White House correspondent for the cable news channel, replacing John Roberts, who had been chief correspondent during the presidency of Donald J. Trump.

History
The White House press corps had their first duties in the White House in the early 1900s. An urban legend exists of President Theodore Roosevelt noticing a group of correspondents in the rain looking for sources for their stories and inviting them into the White House. Subsequent historical research outlines how reporters were able to start with small stories in the White House and then grew their presence and influence over a span of many years.

The White House press "pool" gets its name from the briefing room which used to be a pool until President Richard Nixon converted the pool to a briefing room. The pool which was covered still remains under the briefing room.

Notable correspondents
The following outlets have had reporters covering the White House full time and a permanent assigned seat in the James S. Brady Press Briefing Room:
 Andrew Feinberg
 Annie Karni
 Ashley Parker
 Ayesha Rascoe
 Ben Tracy 
 Bob Woodward
 Carl Bernstein
 Cecilia Vega
 Chanel Rion
 David Brody
 David Nakamura
 Devin Dwyer
 Hallie Jackson
 Helen Thomas
 Jake Tapper
 Jacqui Heinrich
 Jennifer Bendery
 Jeremy Diamond
 Jim Acosta
 John Roberts 
 Jonathan Karl
 Kaitlan Collins 
 Kayla Tausche
 Kristen Welker
 Kristin Fisher
 Maggie Haberman
 Major Garrett 
 Mara Liasson 
 Margaret Brennan
 Mark Knoller
 Michael D. Shear
 Michelle Kosinski
 Olivier Knox
 Paula Reid
 Peter Alexander
 Peter Baker
 Peter Doocy
 Philip Crowther
 Rebecca Ballhaus
 Richard Latendresse
 Seung Min Kim
 Tamara Keith
 Weijia Jiang 
 Yamiche Alcindor
 Zeke Miller

See also
 Press gallery
 Canberra Press Gallery
 Kremlin pool
 Press secretary
 White House Correspondents' Association

References

External links
White House Correspondents' Association official website
Collection of White House Press Pool reports

Political mass media in the United States
White House
American journalism